Chrysostomos A (Madyta, 1868 – Athens, 22 October 1938), born Chrysostomos Papadopoulos (Χρυσόστομος Παπαδόπουλος), was Metropolitan of Athens from 8 March until 31 December 1923, when he became the first Archbishop of Athens and All Greece, serving until his death on 22 October 1938.

References

1868 births
1938 deaths
20th-century Eastern Orthodox archbishops
Archbishops of Athens and All Greece
Greeks from the Ottoman Empire
People from Madytos